is a Japanese voice actor from Miyazaki Prefecture, Japan. He was formerly affiliated with Pro-Fit and is now with Office Osawa.

Early life
In junior high school, he was invited by a friend to help with a children's theater company and became interested in acting. He was injured during his second year of high school and gave up.

Career 
Impressed by Hiroshi Nohara's dialogue of Crayon Shin-chan, which was broadcast during his stay in hospital, he became a full-fledged voice actor.

Filmography

TV anime
2013
Sword Art Online II, Cait Sith, Player

2014
Magimoji Rurumo, Sugawara
Selector Infected Wixoss, Ayumu Kominato
Selector Spread Wixoss, Ayumu Kominato
Wolf Girl & Black Prince, Kazuki Ueda, Couple Man

2015
Charlotte, Male student Amamiya
Is It Wrong to Try to Pick Up Girls in a Dungeon?, Raúl Nord, Canoe's Comrade A, Member A, Customer
Sound! Euphonium, Shūichi Tsukamoto
Haikyu!! Second Season, Takumi Karamatsu, Ōginishi team member
Mobile Suit Gundam: Iron-Blooded Orphans, Chad Chadan, Child soldier

2016
Alderamin on the Sky, Nihado Hiu
BBK/BRNK, Yuki Nono, Student
Sound! Euphonium 2, Shūichi Tsukamoto
The Disastrous Life of Saiki K., Takayuki Maeda, Haruo Sugiyama, Good-looking Boy, Student B, Youth C
Mobile Suit Gundam: Iron-Blooded Orphans Season 2, Chad Chadan
Re:Zero − Starting Life in Another World, Villager

2017
Akiba's Trip: The Animation, Tamotsu Denkigai
Scum's Wish, Tatsuya Hizen, Man
Katsugeki/Touken Ranbu, Ichimura Tetsunosuke (ep 11,13)

2018
Rokuhōdō Yotsuiro Biyori, Ryohei Shibano
Golden Kamuy, Mishima
That Time I Got Reincarnated as a Slime, Rigur
RErideD: Derrida, who leaps through time, Funt
Banana Fish, Alex

2019
The Price of Smiles, Pearce Thorn
Kono Oto Tomare! Sounds of Life, Saneyasu Adachi
Do You Love Your Mom and Her Two-Hit Multi-Target Attacks?, Masato Oosuki
Try Knights, Shōgo Tenkawa
Radiant Season 2, Mordred
XL Jо̄shi, Keisuke Sudō

2020
Seton Academy: Join the Pack!, Jin Mazama
Interspecies Reviewers, Regular Mob A
Hypnosis Mic: Division Rap Battle: Rhyme Anima, Jiro Yamada

2021
Idoly Pride, Kōhei Makino
Full Dive, Martin
86, Daiya Irma
Seven Knights Revolution: Hero Successor, Pollux
Remake Our Life!, Tsurayuki Rokuonji 

2022
Orient, Aoshi Sanada 
Salaryman's Club, Jun Yagami
How a Realist Hero Rebuilt the Kingdom, Piltory Saracen
Requiem of the Rose King, Anthony Woodville
Phantom of the Idol, Yukinari Nada
Eternal Boys, Chika Higashijujo

2023
Mahō Shōjo Magical Destroyers, Idol Otaku
Rokudō no Onna-tachi, Haruya Iinuma
Saint Cecilia and Pastor Lawrence, Abel

TBA
My Friend's Little Sister Has It In for Me!, Akiteru Ōboshi

Anime films
The Anthem of the Heart (2015), Ryūji Fukushima
Sound! Euphonium: The Movie - Welcome to the Kitauji High School Concert Band (2016), Shūichi Tsukamoto
Cyborg 009: Call of Justice (2016), Cyborg 008 / Pyunma
Sound! Euphonium The Movie - Our Promise: A Brand New Day (2019), Shūichi Tsukamoto

Web anime
Azure Striker Gunvolt (2017), Zeno

Video games
Azure Striker Gunvolt (2014), Zeno
Band Yaro-ze (2015), Teppei Shirayuki
Pilgrim Saga (2015), Male Protagonist
Prince of Stride (2015), Chikashi Aizawa, Makoto Shizuno
 MapleStory (2016), Damien
Under Night In-Birth Exe: Late[st] (2017), Tsurugi
The King of Fighters for Girls (2019), Billy Kane
 Namu Amida Butsu! -UTENA- (2019), Zōjōten, Kongōka Bosatsu "Uta"
Disney: Twisted-Wonderland (2020), Sebek Zigvolt
Fate/Grand Order (2015), Beryl Gut
Helios Rising Heroes (2020), Ren Kisaragi
Gate of Nightmares (2021), Balthus

Music/Drama CD
Hypnosis Mic: Division Rap Battle (2017), Jiro Yamada

References

External links
 Official agency profile 
 

1992 births
Living people
Japanese male video game actors
Japanese male voice actors
Male voice actors from Miyazaki Prefecture
21st-century Japanese male actors